WKJC (104.7 FM) is a radio station broadcasting a country music format. Licensed to Tawas City, Michigan, United States, it first began broadcasting in 1980 at 103.9 MHz. WKJC is locally programmed.

History
Between 1993 and 1998, WKJC was simulcast on WKJZ 94.9 FM in Hillman, Michigan. In 1998, WKJZ was switched to a simulcast of WKJC's sister station, classic rocker WQLB 103.3 FM (now adult hits as "Hits FM"), which is also located in Tawas City.

Sources 
Michiguide.com - WKJC History

External links

KJC
Country radio stations in the United States
Radio stations established in 1968